The 2004 season was the Arizona Cardinals' 85th season in the National Football League (NFL), their 106th overall and their 17th in Arizona. The team finished with a 6–10 record, an improvement on their 4–12 record from the previous season, and finished in third place in the NFC West, failing to make the playoffs for the sixth straight season. Season lows for the Cardinals included losing two games to the San Francisco 49ers, the only two games the 49ers won in 2004. The Cardinals, during Week 9, also defeated the Miami Dolphins for the first time in franchise history.

The season was notable for drafting wide receiver Larry Fitzgerald with the third overall pick of the draft. At the end of the season, Emmitt Smith retired after 15 years in the league.

Offseason

NFL Draft

Pat Tillman
On April 22, 2004, former Cardinals safety Pat Tillman was killed in a friendly fire incident while on patrol. Tillman was the first professional football player to be killed in combat since the death of Bob Kalsu of the Buffalo Bills, who died in the Vietnam War in 1970. Tillman was posthumously laterally promoted from Specialist to Corporal. He also received posthumous Silver Star and Purple Heart medals. On Sunday, September 19, 2004, all teams of the NFL wore a memorial decal on their helmets in Tillman's honor. The Cardinals continued to wear this decal throughout the 2004 season.

Personnel

Roster

Regular season

Schedule
In the 2004 regular season, the Cardinals' non-divisional, conference opponents were primarily from the NFC South, although they also played the New York Giants from the NFC East, and the Detroit Lions from the NFC North. Their non-conference opponents were from the AFC East.

Note: Intra-division opponents are in bold text.

Game summaries

Week 7

Week 16

Standings

References

Arizona Cardinals seasons
Arizona Cardinals
Arizona